Robert or Bob Beck may refer to:
Bob Beck (1944–2008), Guamanian zoologist and conservationist
Robert Beck (actor) (born 1968), British television actor
Robert Beck (painter) (born 1950), American painter
Robert Beck (pentathlete) (1936–2020), American pentathlete
Robert Beck or Iceberg Slim (1918–1992), writer and former pimp
Robert F. Beck (born 1943), professor of naval architecture and marine engineering at the University of Michigan
Robert J. Beck (born 1961), scholar of international law and international relations
Robert Nason Beck (1928–2008), pioneer radiologist
Robert K. Beck (1915–2004), American politician and newspaper publisher